Octaviano Juarez-Corro (December 22, 1973 – January 22, 2023) was a Mexican-American fugitive who was added to the FBI Ten Most Wanted Fugitives list on September 8, 2021. He was wanted for the murders of Raymundo Munoz-Silva and Julio Diaz-Guillen, who were shot and killed execution style at South Shore Park in Milwaukee, Wisconsin, on May 29, 2006. Three other people were injured during the shooting. Authorities believed he was hiding in Mexico. Juarez-Corro was the 525th fugitive to be placed on the FBI's Ten Most Wanted Fugitives list. The FBI offered a reward of up to $100,000 for information leading to his capture. He was captured in Zapopan, Jalisco, Mexico, on February 3, 2022.

Murders
On May 29, 2006, Memorial Day in the United States, Juarez-Corro's estranged wife and daughter arrived at a picnic at the South Shore Park in Milwaukee. Juarez-Corro, who was not invited, requested that he see his daughter, but his wife told him he was not allowed to see her. He became agitated and pulled out a handgun. He allegedly lined up four people and shot them all execution-style. He killed his wife's boyfriend, along with a bystander who was also attending the picnic.

Capture
Juarez-Corro was arrested on February 3, 2022, in Zapopan, Jalisco, Mexico. He spent nearly sixteen years on the run.

Death
Juarez-Corro was found unresponsive in his cell at the Milwaukee County Jail on January 22, 2023, and was pronounced dead at 6:45 a.m. CST. He was 49.

References

1973 births
2023 deaths
2006 murders in the United States
21st-century Mexican criminals
FBI Ten Most Wanted Fugitives
Fugitives wanted by the United States
Fugitives wanted on murder charges
Mexican male criminals